Prodinoceras ("Before Terrible Horns") is the earliest known uintathere genus, which lived in the late Paleocene of Mongolia. It was a relatively small uintathere, reaching  in length. It is also regarded as the most basal uintathere, as, although it had the characteristic fang-like tusks, it had yet to evolve the characteristic knob-like horns.

It is very similar to the North American Probathyopsis, which experts regard as its sister genus.

References

Dinoceratans
Paleocene genus extinctions
Fossils of Mongolia
Prehistoric placental genera